Justyna Maria Steczkowska (born August 2, 1972, in Rzeszów, Poland) is a Polish singer, songwriter, photographer, and actress.

Biography
She was raised in a large and musically inclined family, has five sisters (Agata, Krystyna, Magdalena, Maria, Cecylia) and three brothers (Pawel, Jacek, Marcin) and played violin in a family band before becoming a solo singer. She has a vocal range of four octaves.

Steczkowska became famous when she won a song contest in Szansa na sukces programme, performing Maanam's song "Buenos Aires". Later, she represented Poland in the 1995 Eurovision Song Contest with the song "Sama", ("Alone") which was placed eighteenth. After a few CDs with her own songs, she released Alkimja, a compilation of Jewish songs with Polish lyrics. She received multiple awards including a Fryderyk for The Best Song of The Year. She appeared in two films: Billboard and Na koniec świata (To the End of the World).

She took part in the Polish edition of Dancing with the Stars (the sixth edition) where she came second, and co-hosts Dancing on Ice.

In 2013, she was revealed as one of the coaches on the second series of the talent show The Voice of Poland.

Discography

Solo albums

Children dedicated albums

Collaborative albums

Singles

References

External links
 Official website
 

1972 births
Living people
Eurovision Song Contest entrants for Poland
Eurovision Song Contest entrants of 1995
People from Rzeszów
Polish pop singers
21st-century Polish singers
21st-century Polish women singers